Sarah Reich (born May 24, 1989) is a tap dance instructor, choreographer and performer. She is best known as a featured artist for Postmodern Jukebox, touring the U.S. and Europe in both 2015 and 2016. In addition to performing tap-percussion solos with numerous featured vocalists, her rendition of a Star Wars medley was featured in Slate and People magazines. She appears alongside vocalist Sara Niemietz in London, for an MTV, Postmodern Jukebox feature shoot, covering "Ex's & Oh's" in 2016.

Featured in Dance Spirit Magazine's, “20 Hot Tappers Under 20” in 2009, Reich is widely recognized in professional dance circles. She has been on So You Think You Can Dance as a member of Chloe Arnold's Syncopated Ladies, they won the eleventh season's dance crew battle, and she performed in the eighth season with Jason Samuels Smith Tap Co. In 2015, The New York Times, Gia Kourlas, praised Reich's presentation at Tony Waag's "Tap Forward" at the Tap City festival.

Early life 
Sarah Reich was born in Culver City, California. Her mother is Mexican and her father is Hungarian. She started at age five to dance tap. When she was 12 years old she danced salsa in clubs with her sister. Then she mixed the tap steps with the popular salsa and merengue steps.

References

1989 births
Living people
American female dancers
American people of Hungarian descent
American people of Mexican descent
American tap dancers
People from Culver City, California
21st-century American women